William Lansing is the name of:

William E. Lansing (1821–1883), U.S. Representative from New York
William Henry Lansing (1914–1942), American plane captain who was killed in action in World War II